Nano Assault Neo is a twin-stick multidirectional shooter developed by Shin'en Multimedia and released on the Nintendo eShop for the Wii U. It was a launch title for the system on 18 November 2012 in North America, and in PAL regions on 30 November 2012. It was released in Japan on 27 February 2013 by Arc System Works. It is the sequel to the 2011 Nintendo 3DS game Nano Assault.

The game was ported to the PlayStation 4 in 2014 under the title Nano Assault Neo X. It features improved visuals, including running at 1080p. It has the distinction of being Shin'en's first game to appear on a non-Nintendo console.

Gameplay
The object of the game is to eradicate the microscopic deadly Nanostray virus, before it wipes out humanity.  Players pilot a small capsule over various body cells and are required to fire upon enemy virus particles. The game is divided into 4 clusters, each featuring 4 further levels, which the player must complete to unlock the next. Players can also collect tokens which can be used to purchase power-ups in-between levels, such as shields and special items. Online leaderboards are also featured. The game supports Off-TV Play. A co-operative local multiplayer mode allows for two people to play each level simultaneously, with one player using the Wii U GamePad and the other using a Pro Controller, Wii Remote and Nunchuk or Classic Controller, on the TV.

Reception
The game has received mainly positive and some mixed reviews, with a score on Metacritic of 71. Nintendo Life gave the game an 8/10, calling it "a great game that is a little light on content." IGN gave it a 9/10, strongly praising its graphics, calling it "a visual spectacle. Truly, wonderfully stunning." Eurogamer was much more critical, saying, "Nano Assault Neo is my least favourite kind of game; the kind that follows in others' footsteps with little to call its own."

Notes

References

External links
Official international site
Nintendo of America site
Nintendo UK site
Nintendo Australia site

2012 video games
Cooperative video games
Twin-stick shooters
Nintendo Network games
PlayStation 4 games
PlayStation Network games
Science fiction video games
Video games about microbes
Video games developed in Germany
Wii U eShop games
Multiplayer and single-player video games